Takaonna (高女, "tall woman") was a Japanese yōkai that appeared in the Gazu Hyakki Yagyō by Toriyama Sekien.

Concept
The Gazu (illustrated reference) above depicts a woman with an elongated lower body next to what appears to be a brothel. However, the Gazu Hyakki Yagyō has no explanatory text, so it is unclear what kind of yōkai this depiction was intended to be. Some believe that this yōkai was an original invention designed to parody the Yoshiwara Yūkaku of the Edo period.

The book Yōkaigadan Zenshū Nihonhen Jō (妖怪画談全集 日本編 上, "Complete Analysis of Yōkai Paintings, Volume Japan, First Part") by the folklorist Morihiko Fujisawa explains that in a story from the Wakayama Prefecture called Takanyōbō (高女房, "Tall Woman"), a Takaonna would frighten people on the second floors of girō (brothels). 

The book Tōhoku Kaidan no Tabi (Travels for Mysterious Tales of Tōhoku) by the novelist Norio Yamada, the kaidan (mysterious tale) titled "Takaonna" depicts the Takaonna as a homely woman who could never be with a man when she was alive. Transformed into a yōkai from her own desire, she wanders the earth, elongating her body to peek into the second floor of brothels to look at what she could never have. 

These two depictions of the Takaonna became generally accepted in post-war literature, but yōkai researcher Kenji Murakami notes that Fujisawa's explanation is nothing more than one interpretation of Sekien's painting and that Yamada's kaidan is a completely different tale that shares the name of Takaonna.

Incident
In 2016, August 2, staff at the Hidakakōshioya Ryokuchi Park in Gobō, Wakayama Prefecture discovered that a stone statue of a Takaonna had been severed at its base. This Takaonna statue was based on Mizuki Shigeru's design and has been displayed alongside 9 other yōkai statues since 2009. On the 10th of the same month, the torso of the Takaonna statue was discovered at the bottom of the harbor (at a depth of 4.5 meters) and was raised back up; its right hand was broken. On September 16 at around 5:00 AM, the Gobō police station pressed charges against a male high school student for inflicting property damage after kicking the Takaonna statue (which has an estimated worth of 120 thousand yen).

The Carpenter and Taka-Onna

Once in the prefecture of Wakayama was a man who worked wood. This man was married and had a child. He hired 30 servants who went. When her son was five years old, he mysteriously disappeared. After this, his servants began to die one by one. Finally, when there were fewer than half a medium came home and asked what happened. The husband replied that nothing special. The medium then took caution. The man of the house felt strange. His wife asked what had made the medium and the husband said that he had only asked what was happening in the house and then he had retired. The man's wife was neurotic and east to see his reaction, was scared. Then the man lied to his wife he had a fever and went to bed early. Someone came to the foot of his bed and said, "When your wife looks back appearance and must escape to the mountains. You run and run!" After hearing this, his wife looked back and as was to lie in bed pretending to sleep. His wife became an oni. It had a height of 2.1 meters. He took off his clothes and became a beautiful lady accompanied by a roar like thunder, but half of her body still remained spellbound. The husband was shocked and escaped into the mountains. His wife was a Taka-onna which could control the length of the parts of your body. She had killed the servants and if the husband had stayed there also have been slain by her.

See also
List of legendary creatures from Japan
Rokurokubi
Slender Man

Notes

External links
Taka-Onna

Mythic humanoids
Yōkai
Mythological tricksters